The Districts of Trentino-Alto Adige/Südtirol are a subdivision of the two Italian autonomous provinces of Trento (Trentino) and Bolzano (South Tyrol). They were established by a decree of the President of Italy (Nr. 987) on 10 June 1955.

In South Tyrol their name is Comunità comprensoriale or Comprensorio (in Italian), Bezirksgemeinschaft (in German), Cumunità raion or Comunitè comprensoriala (in Ladin). In Trentino is Comunità di valle (in Italian) and Talgemeinschaft (in German).

South Tyrol
South Tyrol is composed by 8 Comprensori/Bezirksgemeinschaften. One of them, Bolzano, is urban and composed only by the city. The city is also the seat of Salten-Schlern, but not part of its territory.

Trentino
Until 16 June 2006, Trentino was divided into 11 Comprensori/Bezirksgemeinschaften, abolished with a provincial law and substituted by 16 valley communities. One of them, Val d'Adige, is a territory composed by Trento and other 3 municipalities, without a capital.

The older 11 district were: Val di Fiemme, Primiero, Bassa Valsugana e Tesino, Alta Valsugana, Val d'Adige, Val di Non, Val di Sole, Giudicarie, Alto Garda e Ledro, Vallagarina, Ladino di Fassa.

Notes and references

External links

 Bezirksgemeinschaften of South Tyrol
 Valley communities of Trentino